Jackpot is the third studio album by Bosnian pop singer Donna Ares. It was released in 2004 through the record label Song Zelex.

Track listing
All of the song lyrics were solely written by Donna Ares herself and produced by her husband Džavid Ljubovci.

Personnel

Instruments

Džavid Ljubovci – guitar (1, 3, 4, 5, 6, 7, 8, 10), electric guitar (8, 10)
Mirzad Pervanić Migos – backing vocals (1, 4, 8)
Donna Ares – piano (2, 8)
Muhamed Šehić Hamić– accordion (3)
Muamer Đozo – bass guitar (10)
Amar Češljar – drums, percussion (10)

Production and recording

Donna Ares – arrangement (1, 2, 4, 7, 9)
Džavid Ljubovci – arrangement (2, 3, 4, 5, 6, 7, 8, 10), programming  (2, 3, 4, 5, 6, 7), mixing, mastering
Muhamed Šehić Hamić – arrangement (4, 9)
Bruno Seletković– arrangement (9)

Crew

Donna Ares – design
Džavid Ljubovci – photography

References

2004 albums
Donna Ares albums